Sànoe Lake is an American actress, model, and surfer.

Early life
Lake was born and raised on Kauai, Hawaii. She is of Hawaiian, Japanese, Chinese, German, Irish and English descent. Her name "Sànoe" means "The Mist of the Mountains." 

Lake was 15 years old when she was discovered by a manager on the beach of Oahu's North Shore when she came in from surfing.  Soon after she began working as a model internationally. Lake had a successful career working as a professional model outside of the action sports industry; however, she became dissatisfied with the modeling industry stating that it often felt "shallow and empty."

Career

Modeling 
Lake was the face used to launch the brand Roxy. The early Roxy campaigns that featured Sanoe were shot by the New York fashion photographer Dewy Nicks. The campaigns are credited for helping to create a new genre within the surfing industry for females by broadening their representation outside of competitive surfing. 

Lake was one of the first female surfers to come out of the surfing industry and cross over into mainstream media. She became known as the "Princess of Surf" throughout the surfing industry due to her multidimensional career. She has been featured on the cover of dozens of magazines and has been featured in various commercials worldwide. Some of the television commercial campaigns Lake was featured in were Target, Mastercard, Gap, Volkswagen, Eddie Bauer and MTV. Some of the magazines Lake was featured in were Elle, Vogue, Vanity Fair, W, Cosmopolitan, Variety, Sports Illustrated, Seventeen, People, Shape and Teen magazine. 
She wrote the book, Surfer Girl.

From 2003 to 2013 Sanoe was contracted to be a face of Billabong Girls. During the decade Lake was contracted with Billabong she was featured in numerous international print campaigns and commercials for the company. During her final year's with Billabong Lake became the ambassador of Design For Humanity. Design for Humanity is an art-fashion-music showcase held at Paramount Studios in Hollywood, California. The block party festival features music, fashion shows, live art auctions and organic food trucks to raise funds for nonprofit organizations that are linked to the surfing community. Lake went on international missions trips to work directly with the nonprofit organizations Design For Humanity donated to.

Acting 
Lake starred in the music videos "Stella" (1999 version) by Jam & Spoon and "If I Could Fall in Love" by Lenny Kravitz (2003).

Sanoe is best known for starring in the cult classic movie Blue Crush (Universal Studios and Imagine Entertainment) in 2002. In 2005, Lake became part of the cast for the film Cruel World starring alongside Edward Furlong and Jaime Pressly. She went on to play the role of Rain in Rolling in 2007. In 2008 Lake stars as Gina, alongside Devon Sawa in the film The Darkness.

She landed the lead role in the 2008 film Half-Life and played the role of Pamela.

Personal life
Lake has two children with husband Michael Sterling Eaton.

Filmography

References

External links 
 

Living people
Actresses from Hawaii
American people of Japanese descent
American people of English descent
American surfers
People from Kauai County, Hawaii
Hawaii people of Japanese descent
21st-century American women
Year of birth missing (living people)